The 2014 Melon Music Awards were held on Thursday, November 13, 2014, at the Olympic Gymnastics Arena in Seoul, South Korea. Organized by Kakao M through its online music store Melon, the 2014 ceremony was the sixth installment of the event. The red carpet event was hosted by Park Eun-ji and Takuya Terada.

Performers

Winners and nominees

Main awards 
Winners and nominees are listed below. Winners are listed first and emphasized in bold.

Other awards

Gallery

References

External links 

 Official website

2014 music awards
Melon Music Awards ceremonies
Annual events in South Korea